Burzyansky District (Böryän rayonı) is an administrative and municipal district (raion), one of the fifty-four in the Republic of Bashkortostan, Russia. It is located in the south of the republic and borders with Beloretsky District in the north, Abzelilovsky District in the east, Baymaksky District in the southeast, Zilairsky District in the south, Kugarchinsky District in the southwest, Meleuzovsky District in the west, and with Ishimbaysky District in the west and northwest. Its administrative center is the rural locality (a selo) of Starosubkhangulovo. As of the 2010 Census, the total population of the district was 16,698, with the population of Starosubkhangulovo accounting for 27.6% of that number.

History
The district was first established on August 20, 1930. It was merged into Beloretsky Rural District on February 1, 1963, but was restored on November 4, 1965.

The Bashkirsky Nature Reserve (a 'zapovednik' strict nature reserve) is located in District, covering mountainous territory of the Kaga River.

Administrative and municipal status
Within the framework of administrative divisions, Burzyansky District is one of the fifty-four in the Republic of Bashkortostan. The district is divided into twelve selsoviets, comprising thirty-four rural localities. As a municipal division, the district is incorporated as Burzyansky Municipal District. Its twelve selsoviets are incorporated as twelve rural settlements within the municipal district. The selo of Starosubkhangulovo serves as the administrative center of both the administrative and municipal district.

External links 
Rafting, Kapova Cave, Honey Hunting in Burzyansky District of Bashkortostan Real Russia

References

Notes

Sources

Districts of Bashkortostan
States and territories established in 1930
States and territories disestablished in 1963
States and territories established in 1965